Thomas Butterworth (17 December 1828 – 15 July 1877) was an Australian cricketer. He played two first-class cricket matches for Victoria in 1857/58 and one for Otago in 1866/67.

References

1828 births
1877 deaths
Australian cricketers
Otago cricketers
Victoria cricketers
Cricketers from Rochdale
Melbourne Cricket Club cricketers